Diana Babar, CBE was a solicitor and Team Leader of the Litigation and Employment Group in the Treasury Solicitor's Department.

She was appointed Commander of the Order of the British Empire (CBE) in the 2008 New Year Honours.

References

Commanders of the Order of the British Empire
Living people
Year of birth missing (living people)
Members of HM Government Legal Service